The 1993–94 Moldovan Cup was the third season of the Moldovan annual football cup competition. The competition ended with the final held on 29 May 1994.

Round of 16

|}

Quarter-finals

|}

Semi-finals

|}

Final

References
 
 

Moldovan Cup seasons
Moldovan Cup
Moldova